Biggles is a 1986 British science fiction adventure film directed by John Hough (later released in 1988 in the United States as Biggles: Adventures in Time). The plot involves time travel between the 1980s and World War I, involving the character, Biggles (from the series of novels by W.E. Johns). The film stars Neil Dickson, Alex Hyde-White, and Peter Cushing in his final feature film role.

Plot
Catering salesman Jim Ferguson (Alex Hyde-White), living in present-day New York City, is involuntarily transported to 1917, where he saves the life of dashing Royal Flying Corps pilot James "Biggles" Bigglesworth (Neil Dickson) after he is shot down on a photo recon mission. Before he can work out what has happened, Jim is zapped back to the 1980s.

He is visited by Biggles' former commanding officer, William Raymond (Peter Cushing), who is now an Air Commodore living in the Tower Bridge in London. Raymond tells him about his theory that Ferguson and Biggles are "time twins", spontaneously transported through time when the other is in mortal danger. Together, Ferguson and Biggles fight across time and against the odds to stop the Germans by destroying a revolutionary "sound weapon" with a Metropolitan Police helicopter that was stolen by Biggles while they were escaping a SWAT team in 1986 London.

Cast

 Neil Dickson as Lieutenant James 'Biggles' Bigglesworth
 Alex Hyde-White as Jim Ferguson
 Fiona Hutchison as Debbie
 Peter Cushing as Air Commodore William Raymond
 Marcus Gilbert as Hauptmann Erich von Stalhein
 William Hootkins as Chuck
 Alan Polonsky as Bill
 Francesca Gonshaw as Marie
 Michael Siberry as Second Lieutenant The Honourable Algernon 'Algy' Montgomery Lacey
 James Saxon as Second Lieutenant Lord Bertie Lissie 
 Daniel Flynn as Ginger Hebblethwaite

Production

Development
As early as 1968, and inspired by the success of films such as The Blue Max, it was planned to make a film based on W.E. Johns' books entitled Biggles Sweeps The Skies scripted by Chris Bryant to be filmed in Algeria and financed by Universal Pictures. Pre-production work was completed, including building replica period aircraft. James Fox was tapped to play Biggles and even appeared in promotional material. However, the film was cancelled, due to budgetary and location problems.

Peter James bought the rights to the Biggles stories in 1976, but the film remained in development hell for several years. The film was produced by Kent Walwin's Yellowbill Films. Walwin had plans to make a series of Biggles adventures and other works, stating:

We want to do not only another 'Biggles', but other films… by buying rights in a whole slew of books, we foresaw the fact that we might be able to go on. We were looking for something with the quality of Bond, not just aesthetically in terms of what we could create, but financially. The subject lends itself to a mini-series – and there is almost certainly that somewhere down the line. And we could do another feature. What we are saying is that 'Biggles' is our Bond.

In December 1979, Dudley Moore, who had just become a star with 10, said he would make the film in Europe after he finished Arthur.

In October 1980, Disney announced they would make Biggles as a co-production with producer Robert Stigwood. In April 1981, a newspaper report said that the movie would be produced by Kent Walwin of Yellowbill Productions, Jack Briley had written the script, Moore would star as Biggles and they hoped for Oliver Reed to play von Stalhein.

In February 1982, it was announced that Biggles would be played by Jeremy Irons, coming off Brideshead Revisited instead of Moore.

John Hough had already directed several movies for Hammer Films and Walt Disney Productions in the United States, and had had box office hits with Dirty Mary, Crazy Larry and Escape to Witch Mountain. He had read the Biggles books as a child and was available after a deal to direct a James Bond film fell through. He was attracted by the unconventional story and signed to direct in November 1984. Neil Dickson was cast as Biggles after the producers and Hough saw his performance in the miniseries A.D. Like Hough, he was a fan of the novels and was thrilled at getting the chance to play the character. Alex Hyde-White landed the role of Jim based on his work in The First Olympics: Athens 1896. The two leads became friends during filming.

Writing
Early versions of the script were written by Michael Fallon and called for an adventure film in the mould of Raiders of the Lost Ark. The original story would have been much more faithful to Johns' original novels. Some sources claim that during scriptwriting, however, Back to the Future was released and became a major hit, so the script was duly altered by Walwin and John Groves to follow this trend, in an attempt to capitalize on Back to the Future'''s popularity.  However, Biggles had already completed filming by the date of Back to the Future's UK release date of December 1985.

The film takes much liberty with the storyline of the original novels. In addition to the introduction of a science-fiction plot, Biggles is much older than in the books (where he is only a teenager in 1917), and the characters, Ginger and Bertie, feature, although they don't join Biggles until much later in the book series. However, the presence of Biggles' friend, Algy, adversary Erich von Stalhein and love interest Marie fits with the earlier books in the series, as does the presence of Commodore Raymond, who employed Biggles for covert operations in the later stories.

Filming
The Eady Levy was due to expire at the end of March 1985, and the movie was partially funded by this. As a result, filming had to be completed before the expiration date. With such a tight deadline, filming began in London on 21 January 1985, before the script had been finalized. Principal photography took place over six weeks between January and March 1985. The film was both Dickson's and Hyde-White's first leading role in a motion picture. It was also Fiona Hutchison's first movie role. She described her character, Debbie, as 'trapped and terrified.' To play Biggles' rival, von Stalhein, Marcus Gilbert researched German WWI fighter aces, especially Manfred von Richthofen. At one point, he can be seen wearing a Blue Max medallion.

Veteran stuntman Gerry Crampton coordinated the action sequences and designed the stunts for the film, while second unit director Terry Coles, who had done similar work on Battle of Britain was in charge of filming the aerial sequences.

The film includes a scene where Biggles lands a helicopter (a Bell 206 JetRanger G-BAKF) on a flat wagon on a moving train. This was filmed on the Nene Valley Railway and was apparently the first time such a stunt had been attempted. Fifteen takes were needed before the director was satisfied that the sequence was finished. The helicopter was flown by stunt pilot Marc Wolff. The JetRanger was later destroyed in a crash in 1989.

The Sopwith Pup that crashes near the start of the film was specially built by Skysport Engineering. The crash was unplanned and the scene was rewritten to work around this.

Locations
The film was mostly shot in London and on various locations in the home counties. Tower Bridge and the surrounding area was extensively used, including the Tower Hotel, which doubled as the film crew's base of operations. The hotel also featured during The Wild Geese, Brannigan and the first Sweeney! spinoff film. Some of the aerial sequences were shot near Millbrook Proving Ground in Bedfordshire. The 1917 weapon testing ground scene was shot at the Beckton Gas Works, which, a year later, was used for scenes in Full Metal Jacket and had been the location for the pre-title sequence in the 1981 Bond film, For Your Eyes Only, which, coincidentally, Marc Wolff had also performed similar helicopter stunts in, and it was seen during the finale of Brannigan. The weapon itself was a custom-made fiberglass dish mounted on a mobile crane. It was filmed at the former London Brick Company works near Brogborough in Bedfordshire, as were the trench scenes. The site is now a landfill and recycling center owned by FCC Environment. The sound weapon appears to be based on a real-life sonic device that the Nazis were working on during the Second World War. It used a reflector to transmit high-energy sound waves. The exterior church scenes were all filmed at All Saints Church, Holdenby, and the courtyard scenes were filmed by the stable blocks of Holdenby House.

Aircraft
Several aircraft were used in the film. These included a Stampe SV.4, a G-BXNW, which is flown by Biggles, and a Boeing Stearman G-AROY, which is flown by his arch-rival, von Stalhein. Both these biplanes are actually from the 1930s, as flying and maintaining actual WWI aircraft was considered prohibitively expensive. The period aircraft seen in the background during ground scenes belonged to the Shuttleworth Collection. The Stampe was flown by Stuart Goldspink, while the Stearman was piloted by former WWII bomber pilot John Jordan. The Stampe was a popular choice for filming, having featured heavily in Aces High and was later seen in Indiana Jones and the Last Crusade. Both aircraft still exist as of 2021.

ReceptionBiggles received a royal charity premiere on Thursday, 22 May 1986 at the Plaza Cinema on Lower Regent Street in London. The film went on general release in the UK on Friday, 23 May 1986. To promote the release of the film, the story was published in newspapers in comic strip form and promoted via ABC Cinemas with discounted tickets available. A novelisation by Trevor Hoyle writing as Larry Milne was published, as was a picture book by Peter James to tie in to the release.

The film was met with mostly negative reviews from the British press, who criticized the story, acting and disregard for Johns' original works. When released in the USA on 29 January 1988, Variety was more positive, praising the action scenes and Dickson's performance especially. Sheila Benson of the Los Angeles Times found the film enjoyable in parts, but overall disappointing. Colin Greenland reviewed Biggles for White Dwarf #77, and stated that  Biggles was "in a silly story about the Germans developing a sonic weapon in 1917 and threatening history as we know it. Too little aerobatics, too much running around in anachronistic locations; lots of laughs, though mainly of disbelief."

The film was not a success at the box office. John Hough observed that the film got into profit later through television repeats and video sales. In the intervening years, Biggles has become a cult film.

In 2000, a new film entitled Biggles Flies North'' was announced after the rights to the character and books had been sold on with a prospective shooting date of 2001 and locations filmed in Malaysia. , nothing has truly materialized and the project has mostly been cancelled.

Soundtrack
The soundtrack was composed by Stanislas Syrewicz and released by MCA Records on vinyl and cassette tape.

Jon Anderson, frontman of Yes, wrote the lyrics for the film's signature song, "Do You Want to Be a Hero?" as well as "Chocks Away", while Stanislas composed the rhythm. Anderson and Stanislas were both signed to Island Records at the time and had agreed to collaborate on the music. Just like the film, the soundtrack drew mixed reviews because of its experimental themes which seemed out of place in a period adventure and heavy use of synthesizers.

Track listing
Jon Anderson – "Do You Want to Be a Hero?" 
Jon Anderson – "Chocks Away" 
Deep Purple – "Knocking at Your Back Door" 
Mötley Crüe – "Knock 'Em Dead, Kid" 
Queen - "Another One Bites The Dust" 
The Immortals – "No Turning Back" co-written by John Deacon in his second non-Queen recording. Deacon was asked by John Hough to compose a song for the film after meeting him shortly after Live Aid. The track was released as a single, and the accompanying music video also starred Peter Cushing in his very last on-screen appearance. The song failed to chart.

Video game
As a tie-in to the film, a video game with the same title was released in 1986 by Image Works for the Amstrad CPC, Commodore 64 and ZX Spectrum. The game was based on the movie's storyline and featured four different missions, including flying combat sequences with biplanes, a rooftop chase, searching for the secret weapon in a trench setting and first-person helicopter gameplay. The game received mixed reviews.

References

External links
 
 
 
 

1986 films
1980s science fiction adventure films
1980s science fiction films
1986 independent films
1980s fantasy adventure films
British independent films
British fantasy adventure films
Films based on British novels
Films directed by John Hough
Films about time travel
War adventure films
World War I aviation films
Fantasy war films
1980s English-language films
1980s British films